The Idol (Polish:Bożyszcze) is a 1923 Polish silent drama film directed by Wiktor Biegański and starring Ryszard Sobiszewski, Norbert Wicki and Antoni Piekarski. The film was shot and set in the Tatra Mountains.

Cast
 Ryszard Sobiszewski as Jan Zadroga, painter 
 Norbert Wicki as Wolski, sculptor 
 Antoni Piekarski as Wezyk 
 Maria Lubowiecka as Stasia Wezykówna 
 Jerzy Starczewski as Jan Zadroga, young 
 Leon Trystan as Wolski, young

References

Bibliography
 Haltof, Marek. Polish National Cinema. Berghahn Books, 2002.

External links

1923 films
1923 drama films
Polish drama films
Polish silent films
1920s Polish-language films
Films directed by Wiktor Bieganski
Films shot in Poland
Films set in Poland
Polish black-and-white films
Silent drama films